Hyalochaete is a genus of flowering plants in the daisy family.

Species
There is only one known species, Hyalochaete modesta, native to Afghanistan.

References

Monotypic Asteraceae genera
Cynareae
Flora of Afghanistan